Ruan Chengfa (born 10 October 1957) is a Chinese politician who served as Communist Party Secretary and Governor of Yunnan, and before that, Communist Party Secretary of Wuhan, mayor of Huangshi, head of the General Office of the Hubei Provincial Government, vice governor of Hubei, and party chief of Xiangfan. Ruan is an alternate member of the 18th Central Committee of the Chinese Communist Party and a member of the 19th Central Committee of the Chinese Communist Party.

Early life and education
Ruan was born in Wuhan. He began working in 1979 as a textiles worker in a local clothing factory. He joined the Communist Party in 1982. He studied international communism at the Central China Normal University and also has a doctorate in law. In 1994, he took charge of the Wuhan securities commission. In September 1995, he became party chief of Wuchang District. In December 1997, he was named secretary-general of the Wuhan party committee. In March 1998, the mayor of Huangshi; in November 2011, the secretary-general of the Hubei provincial government; in December 2002, the party chief of Xiangfan; in September 2004, the Vice-Governor of Hubei.

He was named mayor of Wuhan in January 2008. In January 2011, he was promoted to party chief of Wuhan; as party boss of the provincial capital, he also sat on the Hubei provincial Party Standing Committee.

Career in Wuhan
After Ruan ascended to leading positions in Wuhan, abundant construction activity took place all over the city. Some 5,500 construction sites were operating simultaneously. Some Wuhan locals named him "Manchengwa", a play on his name that literally meant "digs all over town." To this, Ruan responded, "I'm not scared of people calling me 'Manchengwa'. If we're not doing construction, we are doing a disservice to the city." The intense construction work was blamed for extensive flooding after heavy rain in June 2011.

Ruan was credited with explosive infrastructure growth, such as the construction of the Second Ring Road of Wuhan, the Baishazhou Avenue, and the Wuhan Metro Line 8. The projects significantly reduced commute times and eased congestion across the city. However, the endless construction also burdened the city's financial system. In 2011, total planned investment amounted to over 70 billion yuan (~$10 billion). To recoup the massive construction costs, the city issued debt through special financial vehicles, backed up by municipal land as collateral, which typically did not show up on the city's balance sheet (although this practice was common in other Chinese cities as well, at the time), including perpetual bonds.

Career in Yunnan
Having been born in Wuhan and having spent his entire career in his home province, it seemed like Ruan's career was headed to an unceremonious close as he approached the mandatory retirement age for sub-provincial level officials of 60. However, in December 2016, Ruan suddenly transferred to Yunnan province.  On December 13, Ruan was appointed as the Governor of Yunnan. On December 28, at the dedication ceremony of the Shanghai–Kunming High-Speed Railway in Kunming, Ruan mispronounced the abbreviation of the province Zhen instead of Dian while reading off of a script, prompting mockery online, including comments that a doctorate in law should know better.

In November 2020, Ruan was appointed as the CCP Secretary of Yunnan.

Central government
On 23 October 2021, he was appointed vice chairperson of the National People's Congress Social Development Affairs Committee.

References

External links
Official biography of Ruan Chengfa

1957 births
Living people
Politicians from Wuhan
Wuhan University alumni
Central China Normal University alumni
Mayors of Huangshi
Mayors of Wuhan
Governors of Yunnan
People's Republic of China politicians from Hubei
Chinese Communist Party politicians from Hubei
Members of the 19th Central Committee of the Chinese Communist Party
Alternate members of the 18th Central Committee of the Chinese Communist Party